Cymbopetalum is a genus of plant in family Annonaceae.  The Linnean name derives from the Latin cymba, meaning “boat,” and petalum, meaning "petal.”

Some species such as C. penduliflorum and C. costaricense were traditionally used to flavor chocolate.

References

External links

 
Annonaceae genera